The 2013–14 season was Beşiktaş' 56th consecutive year in the Süper Lig, and their 110th season. They finished the season in third place in the Süper Lig, were knocked out of the Turkish Cup by Bucaspor at the fourth round stage and they defeated Tromsø in the play-off round of the UEFA Europa League before they were disqualified from the competition.

Squad

Out on loan

Transfers

Summer

In:

Out:

Winter

In:

Out:

Competitions

Süper Lig

Results

League table

Turkish Cup

UEFA Europa League

Qualifying rounds

Squad statistics

Appearances and goals

|-
|colspan="14"|Players away from the club on loan :

|-
|colspan="14"|Players who appeared for Beşiktaş no longer at the club:

|}

Goal scorers

Disciplinary record

Notes

References

External links
 Beşiktaş J.K.

Beşiktaş J.K. seasons
Besiktas Jk